Darab Dastur Peshotan Sanjana (18 November 1857 – 5 August 1931) was an Indian scholar and Zoroastrian head-priest (Dastur). He is known for his translations of works from Central Asia, in languages including Bactrian, Pahlavi, and Avestan. He became a member of the Royal Asiatic Society of Great Britain and Ireland in 1893.

Life
He was the son of Dastur Peshotan Behramji Sanjana, one of the most sophisticated high-priests and authorities on Pahlavi of his time. Bahramji taught the Avesta and Pahlavi to his son at the Sir Jamshedji Jijibhoy Zartoshti Madressa. Darab studied German, French, and Sanskrit and was elected Fellow of the Bombay University. After the death of Behramji in 1898, Darab succeeded his father as the Principal of the Madressa and as the high-priest of the Wadia Atash Behram.

References

External links 
Bio. Talks about some of his translated works.

Iranologists
Zoroastrian priests
1857 births
1931 deaths
Academic staff of the University of Mumbai
Zoroastrian studies scholars